Russia participated at the 2015 Summer Universiade, in Gwangju, South Korea. Of around 669 people, 471 were athletes, the rest coaches, managers and masseurs. Eight athletes were Merited Masters of Sport, 108 world-class Masters of Sport, 236 Masters of Sport and 114 candidates. The delegation was composed of people from 58 subjects of the Russian Federation, the majority coming from Moscow (112 people), Republic of Tatarstan (40 people) and Saint Petersburg (30 people).

Medals by sport
Mixed events are listed as both women and men.

Medalists

See also
Russia at the Universiade

References

External links
Russia at the medals table

Nations at the 2015 Summer Universiade
Universiade
2015